Communauté d'agglomération du Gard Rhodanien is the communauté d'agglomération, an intercommunal structure, centred on the town of Bagnols-sur-Cèze. It is located in the Gard department, in the Occitania region, southern France. Created in 2013, its seat is in Bagnols-sur-Cèze. Its area is 632.3 km2. Its population was 74,645 in 2019, of which 18,091 in Bagnols-sur-Cèze proper.

Composition
The communauté d'agglomération consists of the following 44 communes:

Aiguèze
Bagnols-sur-Cèze
Carsan
Cavillargues
Chusclan
Codolet
Connaux
Cornillon
Le Garn
Gaujac
Goudargues
Issirac
Laudun-l'Ardoise
Laval-Saint-Roman
Lirac
Montclus
Montfaucon
Orsan
Le Pin
Pont-Saint-Esprit
La Roque-sur-Cèze
Sabran
Saint-Alexandre
Saint-André-de-Roquepertuis
Saint-André-d'Olérargues
Saint-Christol-de-Rodières
Saint-Étienne-des-Sorts
Saint-Geniès-de-Comolas
Saint-Gervais
Saint-Julien-de-Peyrolas
Saint-Laurent-de-Carnols
Saint-Laurent-des-Arbres
Saint-Marcel-de-Careiret
Saint-Michel-d'Euzet
Saint-Nazaire
Saint-Paulet-de-Caisson
Saint-Paul-les-Fonts
Saint-Pons-la-Calm
Saint-Victor-la-Coste
Salazac
Tavel
Tresques
Vénéjan
Verfeuil

References

Gard Rhodanien
Gard Rhodanien